Adik is a surname. Notable people with the surname include:

Govindrao Adik (1939–2015), Indian politician
Ramrao Adik (1928–2007), Indian politician and lawyer

See also
Aşık